Sieglinde Ammann ( Pfannerstill, born 4 February 1946) is a retired Swiss pentathlete and long jumper. She competed at the 1968 and 1972 Summer Olympics with the best result of 17th place in the long jump in 1972. Previously Ammann finished 11th in this event at the 1969 European Championships. Her husband Ernst Ammann competed in the hammer throw at the 1968 Olympics.

References

Swiss female long jumpers
Swiss pentathletes
1946 births
Living people
Olympic athletes of Switzerland
Athletes (track and field) at the 1968 Summer Olympics
Athletes (track and field) at the 1972 Summer Olympics
Sportspeople from Thurgau